There is a small population of . Statistics from Japan's MOJ show 47,965 Burmese nationals residing in Japan.

Migration history
Prior to World War II, some Burmese students studied in Japan; these nationalist-oriented students became the core of the Burmese Independence Army set up by the Japanese prior to their invasion of Burma. During the Japanese occupation of Burma, Japan continued to provide scholarships for Burmese students to study in Japan. Since the 1990s, a new wave of Burmese migrants have come to Japan. Many are residing in the country illegally. Among their numbers are hundreds of activists who had been active in Burmese democracy movements. Initially, the Japanese government refused to recognise any of them as refugees; however, their policy softened after 1998. By August 2006, the government had recognised 116 Burmese in Japan as refugees, and given special stay permission to another 139. These comprised almost all of the official refugees in Japan, with the exception of a few Afghans and Kurds. In August 2010, the Japanese government agreed to accept for resettlement in Japan five families of Karen refugees from Myanmar, numbering 27 people; an additional family of five people chose to decline resettlement in Japan due to the country's high cost of living. The refugees had formerly been living at the Mera refugee camp in Thailand, and had been taking resettlement classes held by the International Organization for Migration.

Burmese migrants in Japan are required to pay a monthly tax of ¥10,000 to the Burmese embassy for a single person, or ¥18,000 for a married couple. The embassy refuses to issue travel documents to those who do not pay this tax; illegal immigrants or overstayers cannot be deported back to Burma, and are stuck in immigration detention centres in Japan. Furthermore, 15 elderly or terminally ill Burmese died in Japan in 2002 due to the lack of funds to pay the back taxes and return home.

Community organisations
The first Burmese political organisation founded in Japan was the Burma Association in Japan, established in 1988. Others quickly followed in the 1990s, including the Burma Youth Volunteer Association, 8888 Association (a reference to the 8888 Uprising), Democratic Burmese Students Organization, Students Organization for Liberation of Burma, Burma Women's Union, Burma Rohingya Association in Japan, and a branch of the National League for Democracy-Liberated Areas. In 2000, a number of Burmese dissident groups in Japan, including the Burmese Association in Japan, the Burma Youth Volunteer Association, the Students Organization for Liberation of Burma, merged to form a single organisation, the League for Democracy in Burma.

Due to the Japanese government's limited assistance to refugees, Japanese voluntary civil society organisations have played a large role in providing aid to Burmese migrants, especially in the field of health care. Organisations established by Burmese migrants or providing aid to them include the People's Forum on Burma, the Lawyers Group for Burmese Refugees in Japan, and the Federation of Workers' Union of Burmese Citizens in Japan. Burmese associations have a strong base of support among mainstream Japanese; the umbrella organisation Burma Office in Japan is especially close to RENGO (the Japanese Confederation of Trade Unions), which provides them with financial support.

Burmese in Japan are also organised in non-political associations and activities. Ahhara, the first Burmese library in Japan, was established in Itabashi, Tokyo in 2000, with the aim of collecting hard-to-obtain books and historical writings. Its name means "Food for Thought" in Burmese. In 2004, the library was moved to Shinjuku to be more conveniently accessible to the Burmese community; its name was also changed to Moe Thauk Kye, which means "Morning Star". The library is staffed by 14 volunteers. Burmese living in Tokyo organise a Thingyan (Burmese New Year Water Festival) celebration, which draws about 5,000 participants annually.

There are a few hundred Rohingyas in Tatebayashi, Gunma.

Notable people
Win Morisaki
Asuka Saitō

Notes

Sources

Further reading
 ; a conference paper based on a series of interviews with Burmese asylum-seekers in Japan
 
 
 

Ethnic groups in Japan
Japan
Japan–Myanmar relations